The Veszprém County Assembly is the local legislative body of Veszprém County in the Central Transdanubia, in Hungary.

Composition

2019
The Assembly elected at the 2019 local government elections, is made up of 17 counselors, with the following party composition:

|-
|colspan=8 align=center| 
|-
! colspan="2" | Party
! Votes
! %
! +/-
! Seats 
! +/-
! Seats %
|-
| bgcolor=| 
| align=left | Fidesz–KDNP
| align=right| 62,209
| align=right| 54.01
| align=right| 4.81
| align=right| 10
| align=right| 0
| align=right| 73.34
|-
| bgcolor=| 
| align=left | Jobbik
| align=right| 14,030
| align=right| 12.18
| align=right| 8.23
| align=right| 2
| align=right| 1
| align=right| 11.76
|-
| bgcolor=| 
| align=left | Democratic Coalition (DK)
| align=right| 11,654
| align=right| 10.12
| align=right| 4.24
| align=right| 2
| align=right| 1
| align=right| 11.76
|-
| bgcolor=| 
| align=left | Hungarian Socialist Party (MSZP)
| align=right| 10,753
| align=right| 9.34
| align=right| 7.07
| align=right| 1
| align=right| 2
| align=right| 5.88
|-
| bgcolor=| 
| align=left | Momentum Movement (Momentum)
| align=right| 10,614
| align=right| 9.22
| align=right| 
| align=right| 1
| align=right| 1
| align=right| 5.88
|-
| bgcolor=| 
| align=left | Our Homeland Movement (Mi Hazánk)
| align=right| 5,911
| align=right| 5.13
| align=right| 
| align=right| 1
| align=right| 1
| align=right| 5.88
|-
! align=right colspan=2| Total
! align=right| 119,029
! align=right| 100.0
! align=right| 
! align=right| 17
! align=right| 0
! align=right| 
|-
! align=right colspan=2| Voter turnout
! align=right| 
! align=right| 49.24
! align=right| 4.67
! align=right| 
! align=right| 
! align=right| 
|}

After the elections in 2019 the Assembly controlled by the Fidesz–KDNP party alliance which has 10 councillors, versus 2 Jobbik, 2 Democratic Coalition (DK), 1 Hungarian Socialist Party (MSZP), 1 Momentum Movement, and 1 Our Homeland Movement (Mi Hazánk) councillors.

List of seat winners

2014
The Assembly elected at the 2014 local government elections, is made up of 17 counselors, with the following party composition:

|-
! colspan="2" | Party
! Votes
! %
! +/-
! Seats 
! +/-
! Seats %
|-
| bgcolor=| 
| align=left | Fidesz–KDNP
| align=right| 56,679
| align=right| 53.00
| align=right| 9.58
| align=right| 10
| align=right| 2
| align=right| 58.82
|-
| bgcolor=| 
| align=left | Jobbik
| align=right| 21,832
| align=right| 20.41
| align=right| 7.03
| align=right| 3
| align=right| 1
| align=right| 17.65
|-
| bgcolor=| 
| align=left | Hungarian Socialist Party (MSZP)
| align=right| 18,623
| align=right| 17.41
| align=right| 6.63
| align=right| 3
| align=right| 1
| align=right| 17.65
|-
| bgcolor=| 
| align=left | Democratic Coalition (DK)
| align=right| 5,878
| align=right| 5.50
| align=right| 
| align=right| 1
| align=right| 1
| align=right| 5.88
|-
! colspan=8|
|-
| bgcolor=#FED500| 
| align=left | Together (Együtt)
| align=right| 3,934
| align=right| 3.68
| align=right| 
| align=right| 0
| align=right| ±0
| align=right| 0
|-
! align=right colspan=2| Total
! align=right| 110,628
! align=right| 100.0
! align=right| 
! align=right| 17
! align=right| 1
! align=right| 
|-
! align=right colspan=2| Voter turnout
! align=right| 
! align=right| 44.57
! align=right| 3.67
! align=right| 
! align=right| 
! align=right| 
|}

After the elections in 2014 the Assembly controlled by the Fidesz–KDNP party alliance which has 10 councillors, versus 3 Jobbik, 3 Hungarian Socialist Party (MSZP) and 1 Democratic Coalition (DK) councillors.

List of seat winners

2010
The Assembly elected at the 2010 local government elections, is made up of 18 counselors, with the following party composition:

|-
! colspan="2" | Party
! Votes
! %
! +/-
! Seats 
! +/-
! Seats %
|-
| bgcolor=| 
| align=left | Fidesz–KDNP
| align=right| 73,315
| align=right| 62.58
| align=right| .
| align=right| 12
| align=right| 11
| align=right| 66.67
|-
| bgcolor=| 
| align=left | Hungarian Socialist Party (MSZP)
| align=right| 28,163
| align=right| 24.04
| align=right| .
| align=right| 4
| align=right| 11
| align=right| 22.22
|-
| bgcolor=| 
| align=left | Jobbik
| align=right| 15,670
| align=right| 13.38
| align=right| 
| align=right| 2
| align=right| 2
| align=right| 11.11
|-
! align=right colspan=2| Total
! align=right| 121,178
! align=right| 100.0
! align=right| 
! align=right| 18
! align=right| 22
! align=right| 
|-
! align=right colspan=2| Voter turnout
! align=right| 
! align=right| 48.24
! align=right| 
! align=right| 
! align=right| 
! align=right| 
|}

After the elections in 2010 the Assembly controlled by the Fidesz–KDNP party alliance which has 12 councillors, versus 4 Hungarian Socialist Party (MSZP) and 2 Jobbik councillors.

List of seat winners

Presidents of the Assembly
So far, the presidents of the Veszrpém County Assembly have been:

 1990–1998 Gábor Zongor
 1998–2002 Csaba Kuti, Fidesz–MDF-MKDSZ-MDNP, and Independent after 2002
 2006–2014 Jenő Lasztovicza, Fidesz–KDNP
 since 2014 Imre Polgárdy, Fidesz–KDNP

References

Veszprém
Veszprém County